Talking Book is a Stevie Wonder tribute album by American recording artist Macy Gray, released on October 30, 2012 on Kobalt Records. It is a cover of Wonder's 1972 album of the same name.

Track listing
All songs written by Stevie Wonder, except where noted.

 "You Are the Sunshine of My Life" – 3:11
 "Maybe Your Baby" – 4:22
 "You and I (We Can Conquer the World)" – 3:10
 "Tuesday Heartbreak" – 3:34
 "You've Got It Bad Girl"  – 4:29
 "Superstition" – 4:30
 "Big Brother" – 3:41
 "Blame It on the Sun"  – 3:47
 "Lookin' for Another Pure Love" – 3:51
 "I Believe (When I Fall in Love It Will Be Forever)"  – 4:35

Chart history

References

2014 albums
Macy Gray albums
Covers albums
Stevie Wonder tribute albums
Rock albums by American artists